Biryuk is an East Slavic surname.

Biryuk may also refer to:

Biryuk (river), a tributary of the Lena
Biryuk (rural locality), a rural locality (a selo) in Olyokminsky District of the Sakha Republic, Russia
Biryuk, Russian title of Lone Wolf, a 1977 Soviet drama movie